The Cloud Appreciation Society is a society founded by Gavin Pretor-Pinney from the United Kingdom in January 2005. The society aims to foster understanding and appreciation of clouds, and has over 50,000 members from 120 countries, as of March 2020.

Yahoo! named the society's website as "the most weird and wonderful find on the internet for 2005". The group and its founder were the focus of a BBC documentary Cloudspotting, based on Pretor-Pinney's book The Cloudspotter's Guide. During an episode of Taskmaster, comedian Hugh Dennis revealed he is a member of the society.

In 2017, the Cloud Appreciation Society was credited with adding the Asperitas classification of cloud to the World Meteorological Organization's International Cloud Atlas.

See also
"Both Sides, Now"
Cloudscape (art)
Cloudscape photography

References

External links 
   
 Article from Times Online
 The New York Times: "The Amateur Cloud Society That (Sort Of) Rattled the Scientific Community," May 8, 2016

Clouds
2005 establishments in the United Kingdom